Kỳikatêjê or Kyikatêjê is a dialect of Pará Gavião, a Jê language of Brazil. It spoken by the Kỳikatêjê people in Terra Indígena Mãe Maria (Bom Jesus do Tocantins, Pará). Almost all speakers are over 40 years old; the younger generations have shifted to Portuguese. Kỳikatêjê is closely related to the Parkatêjê dialect, spoken by another Timbira group in the same reservation.

Phonology

Consonants
The consonantal inventory of Kỳikatêjê is as follows.

The stops /p k t/ are sometimes phonetically aspirated in coda: /pɨtit/ [pɨˈtitʰ] ‘one’. The approximant /j/ surfaces as [ʒ] preceding one of /ɨ̃ ĩ/, as in /mpɔ-jĩ/ [mpɔˈʒĩ] ‘meat’, /pa mũ jɨ̃/ [pamũˈʒɨ̃] ‘I sat down’. /n/ is optionally assimilated to [ŋ] before /k/, as in [ĩnkɾiˈɾɛ] ~ [ĩŋkɾiˈɾɛ] ‘small’. The voiced labial fricative and the glottal stop [ʔ] have been attested in one word each, [kuβeneˈɾɛ] ‘bird’ and [aʔə̃ˈɾɛ] ‘hen’.

Available complex onsets include /pɾ kɾ mp/ (and possibly others). The maximum syllable in Kỳikatêjê is /CCVC/.

Vowels
The vowel inventory of Kỳikatêjê is as follows.

References

Jê languages
Languages of Brazil